Sea Girt is a borough in Monmouth County, in the U.S. state of New Jersey. As of the 2020 United States census, the borough's population was 1,866, an increase of 38 (+2.1%) from the 1,828 enumerated at the 2010 census, which in turn reflected a decline of 320 (−14.9%) from the 2,148 counted at the 2000 census.

Sea Girt was formed as a borough by an act of the New Jersey Legislature on March 29, 1917, from portions of Wall Township, based on the results of a referendum held on May 1, 1917. The borough was named for the estate of Comm. Robert F. Stockton, who had purchased a property in the area in 1853.

In the Forbes magazine 2012 rankings of "America's Most Expensive ZIP Codes", the borough was ranked 197th, with a median price of $1,135,184.

Geography

According to the United States Census Bureau, the borough had a total area of 1.46 square miles (3.77 km2), including 1.06 square miles (2.75 km2) of land and 0.40 square miles (1.03 km2) of water (27.12%).

Wreck Pond is a tidal pond located on the coast of the Atlantic Ocean, surrounded by Wall Township and the boroughs of Sea Girt, Spring Lake and Spring Lake Heights.

The borough borders the Monmouth County municipalities of Manasquan, Spring Lake, Spring Lake Heights and Wall Township.

Demographics

Census 2010

The Census Bureau's 2006–2010 American Community Survey showed that (in 2010 inflation-adjusted dollars) median household income was $96,652 (with a margin of error of +/− $10,474) and the median family income was $150,179 (+/− $26,605). Males had a median income of $118,958 (+/− $48,899) versus $51,953 (+/− $12,836) for females. The per capita income for the borough was $63,422 (+/− $10,659). About 0.9% of families and 4.3% of the population were below the poverty line, including none of those under age 18 and 5.1% of those age 65 or over.

Census

As of the 2000 United States Census there were 2,148 people, 942 households, and 636 families residing in the borough. The population density was 2,026.9 people per square mile (782.4/km2). There were 1,285 housing units at an average density of 1,212.5 per square mile (468.1/km2). The racial makeup of the borough was 99.12% White, 0.09% African American, 0.28% Asian, 0.05% from other races, and 0.47% from two or more races. Hispanic or Latino of any race were 1.40% of the population.

As of the 2000 Census, 34.1% of Sea Girt residents were of Irish ancestry, the 10th-highest percentage of any municipality in the United States, and fourth-highest in New Jersey, among all places with more than 1,000 residents identifying their ancestry.

There were 942 households, out of which 20.8% had children under the age of 18 living with them, 59.1% were married couples living together, 7.1% had a female householder with no husband present, and 32.4% were non-families. 29.6% of all households were made up of individuals, and 17.6% had someone living alone who was 65 years of age or older. The average household size was 2.28 and the average family size was 2.83.

In the borough the population was spread out, with 20.1% under the age of 18, 3.7% from 18 to 24, 18.5% from 25 to 44, 30.2% from 45 to 64, and 27.5% who were 65 years of age or older. The median age was 50 years. For every 100 females, there were 87.3 males. For every 100 females age 18 and over, there were 82.6 males.

The median income for a household in the borough was $86,104, and the median income for a family was $102,680. Males had a median income of $100,000 versus $46,667 for females. The per capita income for the borough was $63,871. About 2.1% of families and 3.5% of the population were below the poverty line, including 7.9% of those under age 18 and 1.9% of those age 65 or over.

Government

Local government
Sea Girt is governed under the Borough form of New Jersey municipal government, which is used in 218 municipalities (of the 564) statewide, making it the most common form of government in New Jersey. The governing body is comprised of the Mayor and the Borough Council, with all positions elected at-large on a partisan basis as part of the November general election. A Mayor is elected directly by the voters to a four-year term of office. The Borough Council is comprised of six members elected to serve three-year terms on a staggered basis, with two seats coming up for election each year in a three-year cycle. The Borough form of government used by Sea Girt is a "weak mayor / strong council" government in which council members act as the legislative body with the mayor presiding at meetings and voting only in the event of a tie. The mayor can veto ordinances subject to an override by a two-thirds majority vote of the council. The mayor makes committee and liaison assignments for council members, and most appointments are made by the mayor with the advice and consent of the council.

, the Mayor of Sea Girt Borough is Republican Donaled E. Fetzer, elected to serve an unexpired term of office ending December 31, 2023. Members of the Borough Council are Council President Diane Anthony (R, 2023), Mark Clemmensen (R, 2023), Tom Downey (R, 2022), Bryan Perry (R, 2022; elected to serve an unexpired term), Dr. Maria Richman (R, 2024) and Alan J. Zakin (R, 2024).

In August 2021, the Borough Council selected Donald E. Fetzer from a list of three candidates nominated by the Republican municipal committee to fill the mayoral term ending in December 2023 that had been held by Francis K. "Ken" Farrell until his resignation from office the previous month. Fetzer served on an interim basis until the November 2021 general election, when he was chosen to serve the balance of the term of office.

In June 2019, the Borough Council appointed Mark Clemmensen to fill the seat expiring in December 2020 that had been held by William Foley until he left office. Matthew Begley was appointed to fill the seat expiring in December 2021 that had been held by Anne B. Morris.

On April 5, 2006, the Borough Council retained a local government consulting firm to review the administrative operations of the Borough and to make recommendations for restructuring and efficiency improvements.  Among the recommendations accepted by the Council was the decision to restructure the Municipal Clerk, Finance and Administration Departments and to create for the first time the office of Borough Administrator (who would serve as the municipality's Chief Administrative Officer).

Federal, state and county representation
Sea Girt is located in the 4th Congressional District and is part of New Jersey's 30th state legislative district. Prior to the 2011 reapportionment following the 2010 Census, Sea Girt had been in the 11th state legislative district.

 

Monmouth County is governed by a Board of County Commissioners comprised of five members who are elected at-large to serve three year terms of office on a staggered basis, with either one or two seats up for election each year as part of the November general election. At an annual reorganization meeting held in the beginning of January, the board selects one of its members to serve as Director and another as Deputy Director. , Monmouth County's Commissioners are
Commissioner Director Thomas A. Arnone (R, Neptune City, term as commissioner and as director ends December 31, 2022), 
Commissioner Deputy Director Susan M. Kiley (R, Hazlet Township, term as commissioner ends December 31, 2024; term as deputy commissioner director ends 2022),
Lillian G. Burry (R, Colts Neck Township, 2023),
Nick DiRocco (R, Wall Township, 2022), and 
Ross F. Licitra (R, Marlboro Township, 2023). 
Constitutional officers elected on a countywide basis are
County clerk Christine Giordano Hanlon (R, 2025; Ocean Township), 
Sheriff Shaun Golden (R, 2022; Howell Township) and 
Surrogate Rosemarie D. Peters (R, 2026; Middletown Township).

Politics

As of March 23, 2011, there were a total of 1,611 registered voters in Sea Girt, of which 210 (13.0%) were registered as Democrats, 808 (50.2%) were registered as Republicans and 592 (36.7%) were registered as Unaffiliated. There was one voter registered to another party.

In the 2012 presidential election, Republican Mitt Romney received 73.2% of the vote (832 cast), ahead of Democrat Barack Obama with 25.9% (294 votes), and other candidates with 1.0% (11 votes), among the 1,146 ballots cast by the borough's 1,624 registered voters (9 ballots were spoiled), for a turnout of 70.6%. In the 2008 presidential election, Republican John McCain received 65.8% of the vote (849 cast), ahead of Democrat Barack Obama with 32.1% (414 votes) and other candidates with 0.9% (11 votes), among the 1,290 ballots cast by the borough's 1,695 registered voters, for a turnout of 76.1%. In the 2004 presidential election, Republican George W. Bush received 72.5% of the vote (962 ballots cast), outpolling Democrat John Kerry with 26.7% (354 votes) and other candidates with 0.3% (5 votes), among the 1,326 ballots cast by the borough's 1,749 registered voters, for a turnout percentage of 75.8.

In the 2013 gubernatorial election, Republican Chris Christie received 84.7% of the vote (789 cast), ahead of Democrat Barbara Buono with 13.5% (126 votes), and other candidates with 1.8% (17 votes), among the 951 ballots cast by the borough's 1,637 registered voters (19 ballots were spoiled), for a turnout of 58.1%. In the 2009 gubernatorial election, Republican Chris Christie received 76.0% of the vote (765 ballots cast), ahead of Democrat Jon Corzine with 18.4% (185 votes), Independent Chris Daggett with 4.7% (47 votes) and other candidates with 0.3% (3 votes), among the 1,006 ballots cast by the borough's 1,658 registered voters, yielding a 60.7% turnout.

Education

The Sea Girt School District serves public school students in pre-kindergarten through eighth grade at Sea Girt Elementary School. As of the 2018–2019 school year, the district, comprised of one school, had an enrollment of 125 students and 16.9 classroom teachers (on an FTE basis), for a student–teacher ratio of 7.4:1. During the 2016–2017 school year, Sea Girt had the 21st smallest enrollment of any school district in the state, with 145 students. For the 2005 school year, Sea Girt Elementary School was one of four schools in New Jersey recognized by the United States Department of Education as a recipient of the National Blue Ribbon Award, the highest level of recognition awarded to an American school; The school was one of nine public schools recognized as Blue Ribbon schools in 2017.

For ninth through twelfth grades, Sea Girt's public school students attend Manasquan High School, as part of a sending/receiving relationship with the Manasquan Public Schools. Manasquan High School also serves students from Avon-by-the-Sea, Belmar, Brielle, Lake Como, Spring Lake, Spring Lake Heights who attend Manasquan High School as part of sending/receiving relationships with their respective districts. As of the 2018–2019 school year, the high school had an enrollment of 969 students and 72.9 classroom teachers (on an FTE basis), for a student–teacher ratio of 13.3:1.

Many graduates choose to attend private school and students have enrolled in Christian Brothers Academy, Lawrenceville School, Peddie School, Ranney School, Monsignor Donovan High School, Red Bank Catholic High School and St. Rose High School.

Transportation

Roads and highways

Route 71 is the most prominent highway in Sea Girt. It follows Seventh Avenue south to north on the west side of the borough near and along the border with Wall Township, connecting Manasquan in the south to Spring Lake Heights in the north.

Public transportation
NJ Transit offers train service at the Manasquan station on the North Jersey Coast Line from the Bay Head station to Newark Penn Station, Secaucus Junction, Penn Station New York and Hoboken Terminal. NJ Transit bus service is available between Sea Girt and Philadelphia on the 317 route, with local service offered on the 830 route which runs between Asbury Park and Point Pleasant Beach with connections to additional local-service routes at Asbury Park.

Points of interest
 Sea Girt Light began operation on December 10, 1896, and is located at Ocean Avenue and Beacon Boulevard. The lighthouse is one of only 20 lighthouses in the state of New Jersey that remain in existence.
 The National Guard Militia Museum of New Jersey maintains a museum in Sea Girt, which includes the Intelligent Whale, an experimental hand-cranked submarine based on an 1863 design.
 Both the New Jersey State Police and New Jersey Department of Corrections have their training facilities in Sea Girt. The New Jersey State Police Academy provides a program for recruits on a residential basis that provides training over a 25-week period.

Climate

According to the Köppen climate classification system, Sea Girt, New Jersey has a humid subtropical climate (Cfa). Cfa climates are characterized by all months having an average mean temperature > 32.0 °F (> 0.0 °C), at least four months with an average mean temperature ≥ 50.0 °F (≥ 10.0 °C), at least one month with an average mean temperature ≥ 71.6 °F (≥ 22.0 °C) and no significant precipitation difference between seasons. During the summer months at Sea Girt, a cooling afternoon  sea breeze is present on most days, but episodes of extreme heat and humidity can occur with heat index values ≥ 95 °F (≥ 35 °C). On average, the wettest month of the year is July which corresponds with the annual peak in thunderstorm activity. During the winter months, episodes of extreme cold and wind can occur with wind chill values < 0 °F (< −18 °C). The plant hardiness zone at Sea Girt Beach is 7a with an average annual extreme minimum air temperature of 4.0 °F (−15.6 °C).

Ecology

According to the A. W. Kuchler U.S. potential natural vegetation types, Sea Girt, New Jersey would have an Appalachian Oak (104) vegetation type with an Eastern Hardwood Forest (25) vegetation form.

Notable people

People who were born in, residents of, or otherwise closely associated with Sea Girt include:

 Lewis Benson (1906–1986), expert on the writings of George Fox
 William T. Doyle (born 1926), member of the Vermont Senate from 1969 to 2017, making him the longest-serving state legislator in Vermont history
 Frederick Bernard Lacey (1920–2017), United States district judge of the United States District Court for the District of New Jersey
 Bruce Lefebvre (born 1969), executive chef at the Frog and the Peach in New Brunswick
 Elmer Matthews (1927–2015), lawyer and politician who served three terms in the New Jersey General Assembly
 Bill Parcells (born 1941), former NFL coach of the New York Giants, New England Patriots, New York Jets, and Dallas Cowboys
 Priscilla Ransohoff (1912–1992), education specialist at Fort Monmouth, daughter of Sea Girt mayor L. H. Burnett
 Richie Regan (1930–2002), basketball player and coach who played in the NBA for the Rochester / Cincinnati Royals
 Robert F. Stockton (1795–1866), United States Navy commodore, notable for his role in the capture of California during the Mexican–American War
 Alex Webster (1931–2012), American football fullback and halfback in the National Football League for the New York Giants. He was also the head coach of the Giants from 1969 to 1973
 Lawrence Aloysius Whipple (1910–1983), United States district judge of the United States District Court for the District of New Jersey

References

External links

Borough of Sea Girt official website
Sea Girt Police Department
Sea Girt Elementary School

Data for Sea Girt Elementary School, National Center for Education Statistics

 
1917 establishments in New Jersey
Borough form of New Jersey government
Boroughs in Monmouth County, New Jersey
Jersey Shore communities in Monmouth County
Populated places established in 1917